Substantial debate exists over the ethical, legal, and military aspects of the atomic bombings of Hiroshima and Nagasaki on 6 August and 9 August 1945 at the close of World War II (1939–45).

On 26 July 1945, United States President Harry S. Truman, British Prime Minister Winston Churchill and President of China Chiang Kai-shek issued the Potsdam Declaration, which outlined the terms of surrender for the Empire of Japan as agreed upon at the Potsdam Conference. This ultimatum stated if Japan did not surrender, it would face "prompt and utter destruction". Some debaters focus on the presidential decision-making process, and others on whether or not the bombings were the proximate cause of Japanese surrender.

Over the course of time, different arguments have gained and lost support as new evidence has become available and as new studies have been completed. A primary and continuing focus has been on whether the bombing should be categorized as a war crime or as a crime against humanity. There is also the debate on the role of the bombings in Japan's surrender and the U.S.'s justification for them based upon the premise that the bombings precipitated the surrender. This remains the subject of both scholarly and popular debate, with revisionist historians advancing a variety of arguments. In 2005, in an overview of historiography about the matter, J. Samuel Walker wrote, "the controversy over the use of the bomb seems certain to continue". Walker stated, "The fundamental issue that has divided scholars over a period of nearly four decades is whether the use of the bomb was necessary to achieve victory in the war in the Pacific on terms satisfactory to the United States."

Supporters of the bombings generally assert that they caused the Japanese surrender, preventing massive casualties on both sides in the planned invasion of Japan: Kyūshū was to be invaded in November 1945 and Honshū four months later. It was thought Japan would not surrender unless there was an overwhelming demonstration of destructive capability. Those who oppose the bombings argue it was militarily unnecessary, inherently immoral, a war crime, or a form of state terrorism. Critics believe a naval blockade and conventional bombings would have forced Japan to surrender unconditionally. Some critics believe Japan was more motivated to surrender by the Soviet Union's invasion of Manchuria and other Japanese-held areas.

Support

Prevention of many U.S. and Japanese military casualties

Those who argue in favor of the decision to drop the atomic bombs on enemy targets believe massive casualties on both sides would have occurred in Operation Downfall, the planned Allied invasion of Japan. The bulk of the force invading Japan would be American although the British Commonwealth would contribute three divisions of troops (one each from the United Kingdom, Canada, and Australia).

The U.S. anticipated losing many combatants in Downfall, although the number of expected fatalities and wounded is subject to some debate. U.S. President Harry S. Truman stated in 1953 he had been advised U.S. casualties could range from 250,000 to one million combatants. Assistant Secretary of the Navy Ralph Bard, a member of the Interim Committee on atomic matters, stated that while meeting with Truman in the summer of 1945 they discussed the bomb's use in the context of massive combatant and non-combatant casualties from invasion, with Bard raising the possibility of a million Allied combatants being killed. As Bard opposed using the bomb without warning Japan first, he cannot be accused of exaggerating casualty expectations to justify the bomb's use, and his account is evidence that Truman was aware of, and government officials discussed, the possibility of one million casualties. However, other estimates were lower. For example, on June 18, 1945, General Douglas MacArthur, the commander of the invasion force, predicted 95,000 casualties (a third of those deaths) in the first 90 days of the invasion.

A quarter of a million casualties is roughly the level the Joint War Plans Committee estimated, in its paper (JWPC 369/1) prepared for Truman's 18 June meeting. A review of documents from the Truman Library shows Truman's initial draft response to the query describes Marshall only as saying "one quarter of a million would be the minimum". The "as much as a million" phrase was added to the final draft by Truman's staff, so as not to appear to contradict an earlier statement given in a published article by Stimson (former Secretary of War). In a study done by the Joint Chiefs of Staff in April 1945, the figures of 7.45 casualties per 1,000 man-days and 1.78 fatalities per 1,000 man-days were developed. This implied the two planned campaigns to conquer Japan would cost 1.6 million U.S. casualties, including 380,000 dead. JWPC 369/1 (prepared June 15, 1945) which provided planning information to the Joint Chiefs of Staff, estimated an invasion of Japan would result in 40,000 U.S. dead and 150,000 wounded. Delivered on June 15, 1945, after insight gained from the Battle of Okinawa, the study noted Japan's inadequate defenses resulting from a very effective sea blockade and the Allied firebombing campaign. Generals George C. Marshall and Douglas MacArthur signed documents agreeing with the Joint War Plans Committee estimate.

In addition, a large number of Japanese combatant and non-combatant casualties were expected as a result of such actions. Contemporary estimates of Japanese deaths from an invasion of the Home Islands range from several hundreds of thousands to as high as ten million. General MacArthur's staff provided an estimated range of American deaths depending on the duration of the invasion, and also estimated a 22:1 ratio of Japanese to American deaths. From this, a low figure of somewhat more than 200,000 Japanese deaths can be calculated for a short invasion of two weeks, and almost three million Japanese deaths if the fighting lasted four months. A widely cited estimate of five to ten million Japanese deaths came from a study by William Shockley and Quincy Wright; the upper figure was used by Assistant Secretary of War John J. McCloy, who characterized it as conservative. Some 400,000 additional Japanese deaths might have occurred in the expected Soviet invasion of Hokkaido, the northernmost of Japan's main islands, An Air Force Association webpage states that "Millions of women, old men, and boys and girls had been trained to resist by such means as attacking with bamboo spears and strapping explosives to their bodies and throwing themselves under advancing tanks." The AFA noted that "[t]he Japanese cabinet had approved a measure extending the draft to include men from ages fifteen to sixty and women from seventeen to forty-five (an additional 28 million people)".

The great loss of life during the battle of Iwo Jima and other Pacific islands gave U.S. leaders an idea of the casualties that would happen with a mainland invasion. Of the 22,060 Japanese combatants entrenched on Iwo Jima, 21,844 died either from fighting or by ritual suicide. Only 216 Japanese POWs were held at the hand of the Americans during the battle. According to the official Navy Department Library website, "The 36-day (Iwo Jima) assault resulted in more than 26,000 American casualties, including 6,800 dead" with 19,217 wounded. To put this into context, the 82-day Battle of Okinawa lasted from early April until mid-June 1945 and U.S. casualties (out of five Army and two Marine divisions) were above 62,000, of which more than 12,000 were killed or missing.

The U.S. military had nearly 500,000 Purple Heart medals manufactured in anticipation of potential casualties from the planned invasion of Japan. To date, all American military casualties of the 60 years following the end of World War II, including the Korean and Vietnam Wars, have not exceeded that number. In 2003, there were still 120,000 of these Purple Heart medals in stock. Because of the number available, combat units in Iraq and Afghanistan were able to keep Purple Hearts on hand for immediate award to wounded soldiers on the field.

Expedited end of war saved lives
Supporters of the bombings argue waiting for the Japanese to surrender would also have cost lives. "For China alone, depending upon what number one chooses for overall Chinese casualties, in each of the ninety-seven months between July 1937 and August 1945, somewhere between 100,000 and 200,000 persons perished, the vast majority of them noncombatants. For the other Asian states alone, the average probably ranged in the tens of thousands per month, but the actual numbers were almost certainly greater in 1945, notably due to the mass death in a famine in Vietnam."

The end of the war limited the expansion of the Japanese controlled Vietnamese famine of 1945, stopping it at 1–2 million deaths and also liberated millions of Allied prisoners of war and civilian laborers working in harsh conditions under a forced mobilization. In the Dutch East Indies, there was a "forced mobilization of some 4 million—although some estimates are as high as 10 million—romusha (manual labourers) ... About 270,000 romusha were sent to the Outer Islands and Japanese-held territories in Southeast Asia, where they joined other Asians in performing wartime construction projects. At the end of the war, only 52,000 were repatriated to Java." 

Supporters also point to an order given by the Japanese War Ministry on August 1, 1944, ordering the execution of Allied POWs, "when an uprising of large numbers cannot be suppressed without the use of firearms" or when the POW camp was in the combat zone, in fear that "escapees from the camp may turn into a hostile fighting force"., The only existing original copy of this general order was found by Jack Edwards after the war, in the ruins of the Kinkaseki prisoner of war camp in Formosa.

The Operation Meetinghouse firebombing raid on Tokyo alone killed 100,000 civilians on the night of March 9–10, 1945, causing more civilian death and destruction than either of the atomic bombs dropped on Hiroshima and Nagasaki. A total of 350,000 civilians died in the incendiary raids on 67 Japanese cities. Because the United States Army Air Forces wanted to use its fission bombs on previously undamaged cities in order to have accurate data on nuclear-caused damage, Kokura, Hiroshima, Nagasaki, and Niigata were preserved from conventional bombing raids. Otherwise, they would all have been firebombed. Intensive conventional bombing would have continued or increased prior to an invasion. The submarine blockade and the United States Army Air Forces's mining operation, Operation Starvation, had effectively cut off Japan's imports. A complementary operation against Japan's railways was about to begin, isolating the cities of southern Honshū from the food grown elsewhere in the Home Islands. "Immediately after the defeat, some estimated that 10 million people were likely to starve to death", noted historian Daikichi Irokawa. Meanwhile, fighting continued in the Philippines, New Guinea and Borneo, and offensives were scheduled for September in southern China and Malaya. The Soviet invasion of Manchuria had, in the week before the surrender, caused over 80,000 deaths.

In September 1945, nuclear physicist Karl Taylor Compton, who himself took part in the Manhattan Project, visited MacArthur's headquarters in Tokyo, and following his visit wrote a defensive article, in which he summarized his conclusions as follows: 

Philippine justice Delfín Jaranilla, member of the Tokyo tribunal, wrote in his judgment:

Lee Kuan Yew, the Former Prime Minister of Singapore concurred:

Lee witnessed his home city being invaded by the Japanese and was nearly executed in the Sook Ching Massacre.

Part of total war

Supporters of the bombings have argued the Japanese government had promulgated a National Mobilization Law and waged total war, ordering many civilians (including women, children, and old people) to work in factories and other infrastructure attached to the war effort and to fight against any invading force. Unlike the United States and Nazi Germany, over 90% of the Japanese war production was done in unmarked workshops and cottage industries which were widely dispersed within residential areas in cities and thus making them more extensively difficult to find and attack. In addition, the dropping of high explosives with precision bombing was unable to penetrate Japan's dispersed industry, making it entirely impossible to destroy them without causing widespread damage to surrounding areas. General Curtis LeMay stated why he ordered the systematic carpet bombing of Japanese cities:

For six months prior to the combat use of nuclear weapons, the United States Army Air Forces under LeMay's command undertook a major strategic bombing campaign against Japanese cities through the use of incendiary bombs, destroying 67 cities and killing an estimated 350,000 civilians. The Operation Meetinghouse raid on Tokyo on the night of 9/10 March 1945 stands as the deadliest air raid in human history, killing 100,000 civilians and destroying  of the city that night. The attack caused more civilian deaths and damage to urbanized land than any other single air attack, including the atomic bombings of Hiroshima and Nagasaki combined.

Colonel Harry F. Cunningham, an intelligence officer of the Fifth Air Force, noted that in addition to civilians producing weapons of war in cities, the Japanese government created a large civilian militia organization in order to train millions of civilians to be armed and to resist the American invaders. In his official intelligence review on July 21, 1945, he declared that:

Supporters of the bombings have emphasized the strategic significance of the targets. Hiroshima was used as headquarters of the Second General Army and Fifth Division, which commanded the defense of southern Japan with 40,000 combatants stationed in the city. The city was also a communication center, an assembly area for combatants, a storage point, and had major industrial factories and workshops as well, and its air defenses consisted of five batteries of 7-cm and 8-cm (2.8 and 3.1 inch) anti-aircraft guns. Nagasaki was of great wartime importance because of its wide-ranging industrial activity, including the production of ordnance, warships, military equipment, and other war material. The city's air defenses consisted of four batteries of 7 cm (2.8 in) anti-aircraft guns and two searchlight batteries. An estimated 110,000 people were killed in the atomic bombings, including 20,000 Japanese combatants and 20,000 Korean slave laborers in Hiroshima and 23,145–28,113 Japanese factory workers, 2,000 Korean slave laborers, and 150 Japanese combatants in Nagasaki.

On 30 June 2007, Japan's defense minister Fumio Kyūma said the dropping of atomic bombs on Japan by the United States during World War II was an inevitable way to end the war. Kyūma said: "I now have come to accept in my mind that in order to end the war, it could not be helped (shikata ga nai) that an atomic bomb was dropped on Nagasaki and that countless numbers of people suffered great tragedy." Kyūma, who is from Nagasaki, said the bombing caused great suffering in the city, but he does not resent the U.S. because it prevented the Soviet Union from entering the war with Japan. Kyūma's comments were similar to those made by Emperor Hirohito when, in his first ever press conference given in Tokyo in 1975, he was asked what he thought of the bombing of Hiroshima, and answered: "It's very regrettable that nuclear bombs were dropped and I feel sorry for the citizens of Hiroshima but it couldn't be helped (shikata ga nai) because that happened in wartime."

In early July 1945, on his way to Potsdam, Truman had re-examined the decision to use the bomb. In the end, he made the decision to drop the atomic bombs on strategic cities. His stated intention in ordering the bombings was to save American lives, to bring about a quick resolution of the war by inflicting destruction, and instilling fear of further destruction, sufficient to cause Japan to surrender. In his speech to the Japanese people presenting his reasons for surrender on August 15, the Emperor referred specifically to the atomic bombs, stating if they continued to fight it would not only result in "an ultimate collapse and obliteration of the Japanese nation, but also it would lead to the total extinction of human civilization".

Commenting on the use of the atomic bomb, then-U.S. Secretary of War Henry L. Stimson stated, "The atomic bomb was more than a weapon of terrible destruction; it was a psychological weapon."

In 1959, Mitsuo Fuchida, the pilot who led the first wave in the surprise attack on Pearl Harbor, met with General Paul Tibbets, who piloted the Enola Gay that dropped the atomic bomb on Hiroshima, and told him that:

Former U.S. Secretary of Defense Robert McNamara, who worked as a USAAF statistic bomber analyst under LeMay's command at the time, stated in the documentary The Fog of War that brute force was sometimes necessary to quickly end the war:

Japan's leaders refused to surrender
Some historians see ancient Japanese warrior traditions as a major factor in the resistance in the Japanese military to the idea of surrender. According to one Air Force account,

Japanese militarism was aggravated by the Great Depression, and had resulted in countless assassinations of reformers attempting to check military power, among them Takahashi Korekiyo, Saitō Makoto, and Inukai Tsuyoshi. This created an environment in which opposition to war was a much riskier endeavor.

According to historian Richard B. Frank,

The United States Department of Energy's history of the Manhattan Project lends some credence to these claims, saying that military leaders in Japan

While some members of the civilian leadership did use covert diplomatic channels to attempt peace negotiation, they could not negotiate surrender or even a cease-fire. Japan could legally enter into a peace agreement only with the unanimous support of the Japanese cabinet, and in the summer of 1945, the Japanese Supreme War Council, consisting of representatives of the Army, the Navy, and the civilian government, could not reach a consensus on how to proceed.

A political stalemate developed between the military and civilian leaders of Japan, the military increasingly determined to fight despite all costs and odds and the civilian leadership seeking a way to negotiate an end to the war. Further complicating the decision was the fact no cabinet could exist without the representative of the Imperial Japanese Army. This meant the Army or Navy could veto any decision by having its Minister resign, thus making them the most powerful posts on the SWC. In early August 1945, the cabinet was equally split between those who advocated an end to the war on one condition, the preservation of the kokutai, and those who insisted on three other conditions:
 Leave disarmament and demobilization to Imperial General Headquarters
 No occupation of the Japanese Home Islands, Korea, or Formosa
 Delegation to the Japanese government of the punishment of war criminals

The "hawks" consisted of General Korechika Anami, General Yoshijirō Umezu, and Admiral Soemu Toyoda and were led by Anami. The "doves" consisted of Prime Minister Kantarō Suzuki, Naval Minister Mitsumasa Yonai, and Minister of Foreign Affairs Shigenori Tōgō and were led by Togo. Under special permission of Hirohito, the president of the Privy council, Hiranuma Kiichirō, was also a member of the imperial conference. For him, the preservation of the kokutai implied not only the Imperial institution but also the Emperor's reign.

Japan had an example of unconditional surrender in the German Instrument of Surrender. On 26 July, Truman and other Allied leaders—except the Soviet Union—issued the Potsdam Declaration outlining terms of surrender for Japan. The declaration stated, "The alternative for Japan is prompt and utter destruction." It was not accepted, though there is debate on Japan's intentions. The Emperor, who was waiting for a Soviet reply to Japanese peace feelers, made no move to change the government position. In the PBS documentary "Victory in the Pacific" (2005), broadcast in the American Experience series, historian Donald Miller argues, in the days after the declaration, the Emperor seemed more concerned with moving the Imperial Regalia of Japan to a secure location than with "the destruction of his country". This comment is based on declarations made by the Emperor to Kōichi Kido on 25 and 31 July 1945, when he ordered the Lord Keeper of the Privy Seal of Japan to protect "at all cost" the Imperial Regalia.

It has sometimes been argued Japan would have surrendered if simply guaranteed the Emperor would be allowed to continue as formal head of state. However, Japanese diplomatic messages regarding a possible Soviet mediation—intercepted through Magic, and made available to Allied leaders—have been interpreted by some historians to mean, "the dominant militarists insisted on preservation of the old militaristic order in Japan, the one in which they ruled." On 18 and 20 July 1945, Ambassador Sato cabled to Foreign Minister Togo, strongly advocating that Japan accept an unconditional surrender provided that the U.S. preserved the imperial house (keeping the emperor). On 21 July, in response, Togo rejected the advice, saying that Japan would not accept an unconditional surrender under any circumstance. Togo then said that, "Although it is apparent that there will be more casualties on both sides in case the war is prolonged, we will stand as united against the enemy if the enemy forcibly demands our unconditional surrender." They also faced potential death sentences in trials for Japanese war crimes if they surrendered. This was also what occurred in the International Military Tribunal for the Far East and other tribunals. Further diplomatic cables suggest the Japanese ambassador in Moscow thought the Foreign Ministry in Tokyo had an unrealistic view of events.

History professor Robert James Maddox wrote:

Maddox also wrote, "Even after both bombs had fallen and Russia entered the war, Japanese militants insisted on such lenient peace terms that moderates knew there was no sense even transmitting them to the United States. Hirohito had to intervene personally on two occasions during the next few days to induce hardliners to abandon their conditions." "That they would have conceded defeat months earlier, before such calamities struck, is far-fetched to say the least."

Even after the triple shock of the Soviet intervention and two atomic bombs, the Japanese cabinet was still deadlocked, incapable of deciding upon a course of action due to the power of the Army and Navy factions in cabinet who were unwilling to even consider surrender. Following the personal intervention of the emperor to break the deadlock in favour of surrender, there were no fewer than three separate coup attempts by senior Japanese officers to try to prevent the surrender and take the Emperor into 'protective custody'. Once these coup attempts had failed, senior leaders of the air force and Navy ordered bombing and kamikaze raids on the U.S. fleet (in which some Japanese generals personally participated) to try to derail any possibility of peace. It is clear from these accounts that while many in the civilian government knew the war could not be won, the power of the military in the Japanese government kept surrender from even being considered as a real option prior to the two atomic bombs.

Another argument is that it was the Soviet declaration of war in the days between the bombings that caused the surrender. After the war, Admiral Soemu Toyoda said, "I believe the Russian participation in the war against Japan rather than the atom bombs did more to hasten the surrender." Prime Minister Suzuki also declared that the entry of the USSR into the war made "the continuance of the war impossible". Upon hearing news of the event from Foreign Minister Togo, Suzuki immediately said, "Let us end the war", and agreed to finally convene an emergency meeting of the Supreme Council with that aim. The official British history, The War Against Japan, also writes the Soviet declaration of war "brought home to all members of the Supreme Council the realization that the last hope of a negotiated peace had gone and there was no alternative but to accept the Allied terms sooner or later". However, others have argued the Soviet declaration of war would not have come as a large shock to the Japanese leadership unlike the atomic bombings as they were aware of a Soviet military buildup in the Far East for months anticipating an eventual attack at a later date.

The "one condition" faction, led by Togo, seized on the bombing as decisive justification of surrender. Kōichi Kido, one of Emperor Hirohito's closest advisers, stated, "We of the peace party were assisted by the atomic bomb in our endeavor to end the war." Hisatsune Sakomizu, the chief Cabinet secretary in 1945, called the bombing "a golden opportunity given by heaven for Japan to end the war".

Japanese nuclear weapon program

During the war, and 1945 in particular, due to state secrecy, very little was known outside Japan about the slow progress of the Japanese nuclear weapon program. The uranium oxide was reportedly labeled as "U-235", which may have been a mislabeling of the submarine's name; its exact characteristics remain unknown. Some sources believe that it was not weapons-grade material and was intended for use as a catalyst in the production of synthetic methanol to be used for aviation fuel.

If post-war analysis had found that Japanese nuclear weapons development was near completion, this discovery might have served in a revisionist sense to justify the atomic attack on Japan. However, it is known that the poorly coordinated Japanese project was considerably behind the US developments in 1945, and also behind the unsuccessful German nuclear energy project of WWII.

A review in 1986 of the fringe hypothesis that Japan had already created a nuclear weapon, by Department of Energy employee Roger M. Anders, appeared in the journal Military Affairs:

Soviet Interference 
Post-World War 2 Japan, under the circumstance that the United States did not drop the two atomic weapons on Japan, could have seen a state of existence comparable to that of Korea and Germany, in the years of Russian/communist occupation on one side and Western occupation on the other. This would not be completely unthinkable due to the Proposed Soviet invasion of Hokkaido, a planned invasion of the northernmost island of the Japanese home islands, which was supposed to start two months before the American Invasion of Kyushu (the southernmost island). Had the Soviets actually commenced the aforementioned invasion and, for that matter, succeeded, they would gain a foothold in an island of immense strategic relevance. In that respect, the United States' (as well as their allies') plan, known as Operation Downfall, may have become a gambit in a situation that could be dangerous or perhaps deadly for the interests of the United States, her allies, and maybe even the world.

While valid projections or viable predictions for such a situation are scarce, a detailed analysis of similar, empirically observed situations provides legitimate reasons to consider Soviet interference a valid concern. In many cases under the criteria that Soviet/communist influence/occupation is observed on part of the country or region and Western influence seen on another, conflict erupted. A few examples of this would include: The Korean War, where a Soviet-backed North Korea invaded the pro-Western South Korea, and ultimately resulted in a multinational war with a UN Coalition, primarily consisting of American forces, versus a joint DRPK-Chinese Communist Party force; The Berlin Blockade, where the USSR sought to starve the pro-Western West Berlin into submission, but ultimately failed due to the Berlin Airlift; The Vietnam War, a Cold War proxy-conflict between the U.S. and USSR, which pitted the pro-Communist North Vietnam against the American-backed South, and so on so forth. In fact, the vacuum left after Japan's surrender in contested areas of China became a shady duel between communism and democracy, as Eugene Sledge writes in the book The Cold War: A Military History: "In northern China at this time were many different armed groups: Japanese, Japanese-trained and -equipped Chinese puppet-government soldiers, Chinese Communists, Chinese Nationalists, Chinese bandits, and U.S. Marines... In Lang Fang and many other areas, even the surrendered Japanese were allowed to retain their arms, under U.S. supervision, in order to help fight the Communists".

Opposition

Militarily unnecessary
Assistant Secretary Bard was convinced that a standard bombardment and naval blockade would be enough to force Japan into surrendering. Even more, he had seen signs for weeks that the Japanese were actually already looking for a way out of the war. His idea was for the United States to tell the Japanese about the bomb, the impending Soviet entry into the war, and the fair treatment that citizens and the Emperor would receive at the coming Big Three conference. Before the bombing occurred, Bard pleaded with Truman to neither drop the bombs (at least not without warning the population first) nor to invade the entire country, proposing to stop the bloodshed.

The 1946 United States Strategic Bombing Survey in Japan, whose members included Paul Nitze, concluded the atomic bombs had been unnecessary to win the war. They said:

This conclusion assumed conventional firebombing would have continued, with ever-increasing numbers of B-29s, and a greater level of destruction to Japan's cities and population. One of Nitze's most influential sources was Prince Fumimaro Konoe, who responded to a question asking whether Japan would have surrendered if the atomic bombs had not been dropped by saying resistance would have continued through November or December 1945.

Historians such as Bernstein, Hasegawa, and Newman have criticized Nitze for drawing a conclusion they say went far beyond what the available evidence warranted, in order to promote the reputation of the Air Force at the expense of the Army and Navy.

Dwight D. Eisenhower wrote in his memoir The White House Years:

Other U.S. military officers who disagreed with the necessity of the bombings include General of the Army Douglas MacArthur, Fleet Admiral William D. Leahy (the Chief of Staff to the President), Brigadier General Carter Clarke (the military intelligence officer who prepared intercepted Japanese cables for U.S. officials), Fleet Admiral Chester W. Nimitz (Commander in Chief of the Pacific Fleet), Fleet Admiral William Halsey Jr. (Commander of the US Third Fleet), and even the man in charge of all strategic air operations against the Japanese home islands, then-Major General Curtis LeMay:

Stephen Peter Rosen of Harvard believes that a submarine blockade would have been sufficient to force Japan to surrender.

Historian Tsuyoshi Hasegawa wrote the atomic bombings themselves were not the principal reason for Japan's capitulation. Instead, he contends, it was the Soviet entry in the war on 8 August, allowed by the Potsdam Declaration signed by the other Allies. The fact the Soviet Union did not sign this declaration gave Japan reason to believe the Soviets could be kept out of the war. As late as 25 July, the day before the declaration was issued, Japan had asked for a diplomatic envoy led by Konoe to come to Moscow hoping to mediate peace in the Pacific. Konoe was supposed to bring a letter from the Emperor stating:

Hasegawa's view is, when the Soviet Union declared war on 8 August, it crushed all hope in Japan's leading circles that the Soviets could be kept out of the war and also that reinforcements from Asia to the Japanese islands would be possible for the expected invasion. Hasegawa wrote:

Ward Wilson wrote that "after Nagasaki was bombed only four major cities remained which could readily have been hit with atomic weapons", and that the Japanese Supreme Council did not bother to convene after the atomic bombings because they were barely more destructive than previous bombings. He wrote that instead, the Soviet declaration of war and invasion of Manchuria and South Sakhalin removed Japan's last diplomatic and military options for negotiating a conditional surrender, and this is what prompted Japan's surrender. He wrote that attributing Japan's surrender to a "miracle weapon", instead of the start of the Soviet invasion, saved face for Japan and enhanced the United States' world standing.

Bombings as war crimes
A number of notable individuals and organizations have criticized the bombings, many of them characterizing them as war crimes, crimes against humanity, and/or state terrorism. Early critics of the bombings were Albert Einstein, Eugene Wigner and Leó Szilárd, who had together spurred the first bomb research in 1939 with a jointly written letter to President Roosevelt.

Szilárd, who had gone on to play a major role in the Manhattan Project, argued:

A number of scientists who worked on the bomb were against its use. Led by Dr. James Franck, seven scientists submitted a report to the Interim Committee (which advised the President) in May 1945, saying:

Mark Selden writes, "Perhaps the most trenchant contemporary critique of the American moral position on the bomb and the scales of justice in the war was voiced by the Indian jurist Radhabinod Pal, a dissenting voice at the Tokyo War Crimes Tribunal, who balked at accepting the uniqueness of Japanese war crimes. Recalling Kaiser Wilhelm II's account of his duty to bring World War I to a swift end—"everything must be put to fire and sword; men, women and children and old men must be slaughtered and not a tree or house be left standing." Pal observed:

Selden mentions another critique of the nuclear bombing, which he says the U.S. government effectively suppressed for twenty-five years, as worth mention. On 11 August 1945, the Japanese government filed an official protest over the atomic bombing to the U.S. State Department through the Swiss Legation in Tokyo, observing:

Selden concludes, "the Japanese protest correctly pointed to U.S. violations of internationally accepted principles of war with respect to the wholesale destruction of populations".

In 1963, the bombings were the subject of a judicial review in Ryuichi Shimoda et al. v. The State in Japan. On the 22nd anniversary of the attack on Pearl Harbor, the District Court of Tokyo declined to rule on the legality of nuclear weapons in general, but found, "the attacks upon Hiroshima and Nagasaki caused such severe and indiscriminate suffering that they did violate the most basic legal principles governing the conduct of war."

In the opinion of the court, the act of dropping an atomic bomb on cities was at the time governed by international law found in the Hague Regulations on Land Warfare of 1907 and the Hague Draft Rules of Air Warfare of 1922–1923 and was therefore illegal.

In the documentary The Fog of War, former U.S. Secretary of Defense Robert McNamara recalls General Curtis LeMay, who relayed the Presidential order to drop nuclear bombs on Japan, said:

As the first combat use of nuclear weapons, the bombings of Hiroshima and Nagasaki represent to some the crossing of a crucial barrier. Peter Kuznick, director of the Nuclear Studies Institute at American University, wrote of President Truman: "He knew he was beginning the process of annihilation of the species." Kuznick said the atomic bombing of Japan "was not just a war crime; it was a crime against humanity."

Takashi Hiraoka, mayor of Hiroshima, upholding nuclear disarmament, said in a hearing to The Hague International Court of Justice (ICJ): "It is clear that the use of nuclear weapons, which cause indiscriminate mass murder that leaves [effects on] survivors for decades, is a violation of international law". Iccho Itoh, the mayor of Nagasaki, declared in the same hearing:

Although bombings do not meet the definition of genocide, some consider the definition too strict, and argue the bombings do constitute genocide. For example, University of Chicago historian Bruce Cumings states there is a consensus among historians to Martin Sherwin's statement, "[T]he Nagasaki bomb was gratuitous at best and genocidal at worst".

The scholar R. J. Rummel instead extends the definition of genocide to what he calls democide, and includes the major part of deaths from the atom bombings in these. His definition of democide includes not only genocide, but also an excessive killing of civilians in war, to the extent this is against the agreed rules for warfare; he argues the bombings of Hiroshima and Nagasaki were war crimes, and thus democide.
Rummel quotes among others an official protest from the US government in 1938 to Japan, for its bombing of Chinese cities: "The bombing of non-combatant populations violated international and humanitarian laws." He also considers excess deaths of civilians in conflagrations caused by conventional means, such as in Tokyo, as acts of democide.

In 1967, Noam Chomsky described the atomic bombings as "among the most unspeakable crimes in history". Chomsky pointed to the complicity of the American people in the bombings, referring to the bitter experiences they had undergone prior to the event as the cause for their acceptance of its legitimacy.

In 2007, a group of intellectuals in Hiroshima established an unofficial body called International Peoples' Tribunal on the Dropping of Atomic Bombs on Hiroshima and Nagasaki. On 16 July 2007, it delivered its verdict, stating:

About the legality and the morality of the action, the unofficial tribunal found:

State terrorism
Historical accounts indicate the decision to use the atomic bombs was made in order to provoke a surrender of Japan by use of an awe-inspiring power. These observations have caused Michael Walzer to state the incident was an act of "war terrorism: the effort to kill civilians in such large numbers that their government is forced to surrender. Hiroshima seems to me the classic case."
This type of claim eventually prompted historian Robert P. Newman, a supporter of the bombings, to say "there can be justified terror, as there can be just wars".

Certain scholars and historians have characterized the atomic bombings of Japan as a form of "state terrorism". This interpretation is based on a definition of terrorism as "the targeting of innocents to achieve a political goal". As Frances V. Harbour points out, the meeting of the Target Committee in Los Alamos on 10 and 11 May 1945 suggested targeting the large population centers of Kyoto or Hiroshima for a "psychological effect" and to make "the initial use sufficiently spectacular for the importance of the weapon to be internationally recognized". As such, Professor Harbour suggests the goal was to create terror for political ends both in and beyond Japan. However, Burleigh Taylor Wilkins believes it stretches the meaning of "terrorism" to include wartime acts.

Historian Howard Zinn wrote that the bombings were terrorism. Zinn cites the sociologist Kai Erikson who said that the bombings could not be called "combat" because they targeted civilians. Just War theorist Michael Walzer said that while taking the lives of civilians can be justified under conditions of 'supreme emergency', the war situation at that time did not constitute such an emergency.

Tony Coady, Frances V. Harbour, and Jamal Nassar also view the targeting of civilians during the bombings as a form of terrorism. Nassar classifies the atomic bombings as terrorism in the same vein as the firebombing of Tokyo, the firebombing of Dresden, and the Holocaust.

Richard A. Falk, professor Emeritus of International Law and Practice at Princeton University has written in detail about Hiroshima and Nagasaki as instances of state terrorism. He said that "the explicit function of the attacks was to terrorize the population through mass slaughter and to confront its leaders with the prospect of national annihilation".

Author Steven Poole said that the "people killed by terrorism" are not the targets of the intended terror effect. He said that the atomic bombings were "designed as an awful demonstration" aimed at Stalin and the government of Japan.

Alexander Werth, historian and BBC Eastern Front war correspondent, suggests that the nuclear bombing of Japan mainly served to demonstrate the new weapon in the most shocking way, virtually at the Soviet Union's doorstep, in order to prepare the political post-war field.

Fundamentally immoral
The Vatican newspaper L'Osservatore Romano expressed regret in August 1945 that the bomb's inventors did not destroy the weapon for the benefit of humanity. Rev. Cuthbert Thicknesse, the Dean of St Albans, prohibited using St Albans Abbey for a thanksgiving service for the war's end, calling the use of atomic weapons "an act of wholesale, indiscriminate massacre". In 1946, a report by the Federal Council of Churches entitled Atomic Warfare and the Christian Faith, includes the following passage:

The bombers' chaplain, Father George Benedict Zabelka, would later renounce the bombings after visiting Nagasaki with two fellow chaplains.

Continuation of previous behavior

American historian Gabriel Kolko said certain discussion regarding the moral dimension of the attacks is wrong-headed, given the fundamental moral decision had already been made:

Nagasaki bombing unnecessary

The second atomic bombing, on Nagasaki, came only three days after the bombing of Hiroshima, when the devastation at Hiroshima had yet to be fully comprehended by the Japanese. The lack of time between the bombings has led some historians to state that the second bombing was "certainly unnecessary", "gratuitous at best and genocidal at worst", and not jus in bello. In response to the claim that the atomic bombing of Nagasaki was unnecessary, Maddox wrote:

Jerome Hagen indicates that War Minister Anami's revised briefing was partly based on interrogating captured American pilot Marcus McDilda. Under torture, McDilda reported that the Americans had 100 atomic bombs, and that Tokyo and Kyoto would be the next atomic bomb targets. Both were lies; McDilda was not involved or briefed on the Manhattan Project and simply told the Japanese what he thought they wanted to hear.

One day before the bombing of Nagasaki, the Emperor notified Foreign Minister Shigenori Tōgō of his desire to "insure a prompt ending of hostilities". Tōgō wrote in his memoir that the Emperor "warned [him] that since we could no longer continue the struggle, now that a weapon of this devastating power was used against us, we should not let slip the opportunity [to end the war] by engaging in attempts to gain more favorable conditions". The Emperor then requested Tōgō to communicate his wishes to the Prime Minister.

Dehumanization
Historian James J. Weingartner sees a connection between the American mutilation of Japanese war dead and the bombings. According to Weingartner both were partially the result of a dehumanization of the enemy. "[T]he widespread image of the Japanese as sub-human constituted an emotional context which provided another justification for decisions which resulted in the death of hundreds of thousands." On the second day after the bombing of Nagasaki, President Truman had stated: "The only language they seem to understand is the one we have been using to bombard them. When you have to deal with a beast you have to treat him like a beast. It is most regrettable but nevertheless true".

International law

At the time of the atomic bombings, there was no international treaty or instrument protecting a civilian population specifically from attack by aircraft. Many critics of the atomic bombings point to the Hague Conventions of 1899 and 1907 as setting rules in place regarding the attack of civilian populations. The Hague Conventions contained no specific air warfare provisions but it prohibited the targeting of undefended civilians by naval artillery, field artillery, or siege engines, all of which were classified as "bombardment". However, the Conventions allowed the targeting of military establishments in cities, including military depots, industrial plants, and workshops which could be used for war. This set of rules was not followed during World War I which saw bombs dropped indiscriminately on cities by Zeppelins and multi-engine bombers. Afterward, another series of meetings were held at The Hague in 1922–23, but no binding agreement was reached regarding air warfare. During the 1930s and 1940s, the aerial bombing of cities was resumed, notably by the German Condor Legion against the cities of Guernica and Durango in Spain in 1937 during the Spanish Civil War. This led to an escalation of various cities bombed, including Chongqing, Warsaw, Rotterdam, London, Coventry, Hamburg, Dresden, and Tokyo. All of the major belligerents in World War II dropped bombs on civilians in cities.

Modern debate over the applicability of the Hague Conventions to the atomic bombings of Hiroshima and Nagasaki revolves around whether the Conventions can be assumed to cover modes of warfare that were at the time unknown; whether rules for artillery bombardment can be applied to rules for aerial bombing. As well, the debate hinges on to what degree the Hague Conventions was being followed by the warring countries.

If the Hague Conventions is admitted as applicable, the critical question becomes whether the bombed cities met the definition of "undefended". Some observers consider Hiroshima and Nagasaki undefended, some say that both cities were legitimate military targets, and others say that Hiroshima could be considered a legitimate military target while Nagasaki was comparatively undefended. Hiroshima has been argued as not a legitimate target because the major industrial plants were just outside the target area. It has also been argued as a legitimate target because Hiroshima was the headquarters of the regional Second General Army and Fifth Division with 40,000 combatants stationed in the city. Both cities were protected by anti-aircraft guns, which is an argument against the definition of "undefended".

The Hague Conventions prohibited poison weapons. The radioactivity of the atomic bombings has been described as poisonous, especially in the form of nuclear fallout which kills more slowly. However, this view was rejected by the International Court of Justice in 1996, which stated that the primary and exclusive use of (air burst) nuclear weapons is not to poison or asphyxiate and thus is not prohibited by the Geneva Protocol.

The Hague Conventions also prohibited the employment of "arms, projectiles, or material calculated to cause unnecessary suffering". The Japanese government cited this prohibition on 10 August 1945 after submitting a letter of protest to the United States denouncing the use of atomic bombs. However, the prohibition only applied to weapons as lances with a barbed head, irregularly shaped bullets, projectiles filled with glass, the use of any substance on bullets that would tend unnecessarily to inflame a wound inflicted by them, along with grooving bullet tips or the creation of soft point bullets by filing off the ends of the hard coating on full metal jacketed bullets.

It however did not apply to the use of explosives contained in artillery projectiles, mines, aerial torpedoes, or hand grenades. In 1962 and in 1963, the Japanese government retracted its previous statement by saying that there was no international law prohibiting the use of atomic bombs.

The Hague Conventions stated that religious buildings, art and science centers, charities, hospitals, and historic monuments were to be spared as far as possible in a bombardment, unless they were being used for military purposes. Critics of the atomic bombings point to many of these kinds of structures which were destroyed in Hiroshima and Nagasaki. However, the Hague Conventions also stated that for the destruction of the enemy's property to be justified, it must be "imperatively demanded by the necessities of war". Because of the inaccuracy of heavy bombers in World War II, it was not practical to target military assets in cities without damage to civilian targets.

Even after the atomic bombs were dropped on Japan, no international treaty banning or condemning nuclear warfare has ever been ratified. The closest example is a resolution by the UN General Assembly which stated that nuclear warfare was not in keeping with the UN charter, passed in 1953 with a vote of 25 to 20, and 26 abstentions.

Impact on surrender

Varying opinions exist on the question of what role the bombings played in Japan's surrender, and some regard the bombings as the deciding factor, but others see the bombs as a minor factor, and yet others assess their importance as unknowable.

The mainstream position in the United States from 1945 to the 1960s regarded the bombings as the decisive factor in ending the war, which has been termed by commentators as the "traditionalist" view or pejoratively as the "patriotic orthodoxy."

Some, on the other hand, see the Soviet invasion of Manchuria as primary or decisive. In the US, Robert Pape and Tsuyoshi Hasegawa have particularly advanced this view, which some have found convincing, but others have criticized it.

Robert Pape also argues:

In Japanese writing about the surrender, many accounts consider the Soviet entry into the war as the primary reason or as having equal importance with the atomic bombs, and others, such as the work of Sadao Asada, give primacy to the atomic bombings, particularly their impact on the emperor. The primacy of the Soviet entry as a reason for surrender is a longstanding view by some Japanese historians, and it has appeared in some Japanese junior high school textbooks.

The argument about the Soviet role in Japan's surrender has a connection with the argument about the Soviet role in America's decision to drop the bomb. Both arguments emphasize the importance of the Soviet Union. The former suggests that Japan surrendered to the US out of fear of the Soviet Union, and the latter emphasizes that the US dropped the bombs to intimidate the Soviet Union. Soviet accounts of the ending of the war emphasised the role of the Soviet Union. The Great Soviet Encyclopedia summarised events thus:

In August 1945 American military air forces dropped atomic bombs on the cities of Hiroshima (6 August) and of Nagasaki (9 August). These bombings were not caused by military necessity, and served primarily political aims. They inflicted enormous damage on the peaceable population.

Fulfilling the obligations entered into by agreement with its allies and aiming for a very speedy ending of the second world war, the Soviet government on 8 August 1945 declared that from 9 August 1945 the USSR would be in a state of war against [Japan], and associated itself with the 1945 Potsdam declaration... of the governments of the USA, Great Britain and China of 26 July 1945, which demanded the unconditional capitulation of [Japan] and foreshadowed the bases of its subsequent demilitarization and democratization. The attack by Soviet forces, smashing the Kwantung Army and liberating Manchuria, Northern Korea, Southern Sakhalin and the Kuril Islands, led to the rapid conclusion of the war in the Far East. On 2 September 1945 [Japan] signed the act of unconditional capitulation.

Japan had declared its surrender three days before the August 18 Soviet invasion of the Kuril Islands, which received comparatively little military opposition because of the earlier declaration to surrender.

The Soviet Navy was regarded by certain people as chronically lacking the naval capability to invade the home islands of Japan, despite having received numerous ships under loan from the US.

Still others have argued that war-weary Japan would likely have surrendered regardless because of a collapse of the economy; the lack of army, food, and industrial materials; threat of internal revolution; and the talk of surrender since earlier in the year. However, others find it unlikely and argue that Japan could likely have put up a spirited resistance.

The Japanese historian Sadao Asada argues that the ultimate decision to surrender was a personal decision by the emperor, who was influenced by the atomic bombings.

Atomic diplomacy

A further argument, discussed under the rubric of "atomic diplomacy" and advanced in a 1965 book of that name by Gar Alperovitz, is that the bombings had as primary purpose to intimidate the Soviet Union and were the opening shots of the Cold War. Along those lines, some argue that the United States raced the Soviet Union and hoped to drop the bombs and receive surrender from Japan before a Soviet entry into the Pacific War.
However, the Soviet Union, the United States, and the United Kingdom came to an agreement at the Yalta Conference on when the Soviet Union should join the war against Japan and on how the territory of Japan was to be divided at the end of the war.

Others argue that such considerations played little or no role, the United States being instead concerned with the surrender of Japan, and in fact, the United States desired and appreciated the Soviet entry into the Pacific War, as it hastened the surrender of Japan. In his memoirs, Truman wrote: "There were many reasons for my going to Potsdam, but the most urgent, to my mind, was to get from Stalin a personal reaffirmation of Russia's entry into the war against Japan, a matter which our military chiefs were most anxious to clinch. This I was able to get from Stalin in the very first days of the conference."

Campbell Craig and Fredrik Logevall argue the two bombs were dropped for different reasons:

US public opinion on the bombings 
The Pew Research Center conducted a 2015 survey showing that 56% of Americans supported the atomic bombings of Hiroshima and Nagasaki and 34% opposed. The study highlighted the impact of the respondents' generations, showing that support for the bombings was 70% among Americans 65 and older but only 47% for those between 18 and 29. Political leanings also impacted responses, according to the survey; support was measured at 74% for Republicans and 52% for Democrats.

American approval of the bombings has decreased substantially since 1945, when a Gallup poll showed 85% support while only 10% disapproved. Forty-five years later, in 1990, Gallup conducted another poll and found 53% support and 41% opposition. Another Gallup poll in 2005 echoed the findings of the 2015 Pew Research Center study by finding 57% support with 38% opposition. While the poll data from the Pew Research Center and Gallup show a stark drop in support for the bombings over the last half-century, Stanford political scientists have conducted research supporting their hypothesis that American public support for the use of nuclear force would be just as high today as in 1945 if a similar yet contemporary scenario presented itself.

In a 2017 study conducted by political scientists Scott D. Sagan and Benjamin A. Valentino, respondents were asked if they would support the use of atomic force in a hypothetical situation that kills 100,000 Iranian civilians versus an invasion that would result in the deaths of 20,000 American soldiers. The results showed that 59% of Americans would approve of a nuclear strike in such a situation. However, a 2010 Pew survey showed that 64% of Americans approved of Barack Obama's declaration that the US would abstain from the use of nuclear weapons against nations that did not have them.

See also
 Hiroshima, by John Hersey
 Nuclear disarmament
 Cultural treatments of the atomic bombings of Hiroshima and Nagasaki

References

Notes

Bibliography

Further reading
  Concludes the bombings were justified.
  Weighs whether the bombings were justified or necessary, concludes they were not.
  Weighs whether the bombings were justified or necessary.
  "The thing had to be done", but "Circumstances are heavy with misgiving."
  Explains the conflicts and debates within the Japanese government from the onset of World War II until surrender. Concludes the bombings were justified.
  Concludes that the bombs were not only necessary, but legally and morally acceptable (1966 reprint).
  Based on previously classified documents. Concludes that the dropping the bombs was superior to all other alternatives and saved Japanese as well as American lives.
  Exceedingly Orthodox article, defends the bomb but not a serious academic work.
  Philosophical and moral discussion concerning the Allied strategy of area bombing in World War II, including the use of atomic weapons on Hiroshima and Nagasaki.
  Concludes that the atomic bombings were unnecessary. Challenges the view that the atomic bombings were necessary to end the Pacific War and save lives.
  Argues that the bombs were not the deciding factor in ending the war. The Soviet entrance into the Pacific War was the primary cause for Japan's surrender.
  Here he sharpens his earlier view that the Soviet entrance into the Pacific War was the primary cause for Japan's surrender.
  Author is a diplomatic historian who favors Truman's decision to drop the atomic bombs.
  An analysis critical of postwar opposition to the atom bombings.
  Covers the controversy over the content of the 1995 Smithsonian Institution exhibition associated with the display of the Enola Gay; includes complete text of the planned (and canceled) exhibition.

External links
 Hiroshima: Was It Necessary?
 Reflections of a Far East Prisoner of War on the use of the atomic bombs
 Annotated bibliography on the decision to use the atomic bombs on Japan  – The Alsos Digital Library for Nuclear Issues
 Unconditional Surrender, Demobilization, and the Atomic Bomb by Michael D. Pearlman U.S. Army Command and General Staff College Fort Leavenworth, KS
 "The Obliteration of Hiroshima", Stephen Shalom (from New Politics, vol. 6, no. 1 (new series), whole no. 21, Summer 1996)
 Hiroshima: the 'White Man's Bomb' revisited: Dropping the Bomb on Japan was the final act of a bitter race war in the Pacific. by Mick Hume, Spiked, 2 August 2005. Abridged version of a 1995 article in Living Marxism.
 Yuki Tanaka and Richard Falk, "The Atomic Bombing, The Tokyo War Crimes Tribunal and the Shimoda Case: Lessons for Anti-Nuclear Legal Movements", The Asia-Pacific Journal, Vol. 44-3-09, 2 November 2009.
 Record of private talk between Winston Churchill and Generalissimo Stalin after the Plenary Session on 17 July 1945 at Potsdam
 The Enola Gay Controversy – About  – Overview
 International Peoples' Tribunal on the Dropping of Atomic Bombs on Hiroshima and Nagasaki
 
 
 
 
 

Atomic Bombings Of Hiroshima And Nagasaki
1945 in military history
Debate
Atomic Bombings Of Hiroshima And Nagasaki